Gurjit Singh may refer to:

 Tiger Ali Singh (Gurjit Singh, born 1971), Indo-Canadian professional wrestler
 Gurjit Singh (ambassador), Indian civil servant and ambassador to Germany
 Gurjit Singh (football manager), Fijian football manager